Tallon is a given name, and a surname. As a surname it is of Norman-derived Irish origin and was Gaelicised as Talún.

Tallon  may refer to:

 Andrew Tallon (1949–2018), Belgian art historian
 Dale Tallon (born 1950), Canadian ice hockey defenceman and executive
 Don Tallon (1916–1984), Australian cricketer
 Gary Tallon (born 1973), Irish footballer
 James R. Tallon (born 1941), American politician
 Jeff Tallon, Canadian artist
 Liam Tallon, Australian rugby league player
 Robin Tallon (born 1946), American politician
 William Tallon (1935–2007), English steward

As a given name:
 Tallon Griekspoor (born 1996), Dutch tennis player

See also
 Scott Tallon Walker, architects
 Tallon IV, a fictional planet and main setting of the video game Metroid Prime